Johann Alexander Hübler-Kahla (23 June 1902 – 6 April 1965) was an Austrian screenwriter, film producer, and director. He directed seventeen films including the musical comedy Dance Music (1935) and the Karl May adaptation Across the Desert (1936).

Selected filmography

Director
 Blood Brothers (1935)
 Dance Music (1935)
 The Violet of Potsdamer Platz (1936)
 Across the Desert (1936)
 The Mysterious Mister X (1936)
 Mikosch Comes In (1952)
  (1952)
 Dutch Girl (1953)
 The Inn on the Lahn (1955)

Producer
 The Trial (1948)
 My Aunt, Your Aunt (1956)
 Doctor Bertram (1957)
 The Hero of My Dreams (1960)

Writer
 Blood Brothers (1935)
 The Hero of My Dreams (1960)

References

Bibliography
 Waldman, Harry. Nazi Films In America, 1933–1942. McFarland & Co, 2008.

External links
 

1902 births
1965 deaths
Austrian film directors
Austrian film producers
Austrian male screenwriters
Film people from Vienna
20th-century Austrian screenwriters
20th-century Austrian male writers